Duncan McRae may refer to:

Duncan McRae (rugby) (born 1974), Australian former rugby footballer
Duncan McRae (politician) (died 1879), Scottish-Canadian politician
Duncan McRae (actor) (1873–1931), British-American actor and film director
Duncan McRae (designer) (1919–1984), American industrial designer
 Duncan K. McRae (1820–1888), American politician from North Carolina

See also
Duncan Macrae (disambiguation)